Nenad Kecmanović, PhD, (Serbian Cyrillic: Ненад Кецмановић; born 9 September 1947) is a Bosnian Serb political scientist, sociologist, political analyst, publicist, professor of political science, retired politician, member of the Senate of Republika Srpska, since 1996 and former member of the Presidency of Bosnia and Herzegovina, from 17 June 1992 until 6 July 1992. Kecmanović was the rector of the University of Sarajevo from 1988 until 1992 and the Bosnian War, since when he resides in Belgrade, Serbia.

Academic career
Kecmanović was born in Sarajevo, PR Bosnia and Herzegovina, FPR Yugoslavia on 9 September 1947. He graduated in sociology in 1971 as a student of the generation, and in political science in 1973, from the University of Sarajevo, after which he worked as an assistant at the Faculty of Political Science. He received his doctorate in "Convergence of Political Systems" in 1975. In 1976, Kecmanović became an assistant professor at the same Faculty, an associate professor in 1979, becoming full professor in 1984. Until the Bosnian War, he was a professor of political science and dean of the Faculty of Political Science in Sarajevo. He was the rector of the University of Sarajevo from 1988 until the start of the Bosnian War in 1992 and the breakup of Yugoslavia. In 1991, he received an honorary doctorate from the University of Michigan.

In Belgrade, Serbia, he worked as a professor and head of the Department of Political Science at the Faculty of Political Sciences, University of Belgrade.

He is currently active as a full professor at the University of East Sarajevo. Kecmanović was also the former dean of the University of Banja Luka, where he currently works as an associate professor. He has been a member of the Senate of Republika Srpska since September 1996. He was elected an expert of the United Nations Center for Peace and Development in Paris in 1998, and in 2006 he became a member of the Russian Academy of Sciences in Moscow.

Political career
In mid-1990 and the introduction of the multi-party system in Yugoslavia, Kecmanović founded a Bosnian branch of Ante Marković's centre-left Union of Reform Forces of Yugoslavia party. Kecmanović was president of the party's Bosnian branch and its leader at the 1990 general election. In 1990, at the last Yugoslav Presidency elections, he was elected a member of the Presidency of Yugoslavia, but was immediately removed from that position through the State Security Service, under the pretext of "insufficient security culture". When Biljana Plavšić and Nikola Koljević (both from the Serb Democratic Party) resigned their post as Serb members of the Presidency of Bosnia and Herzegovina in June 1992, Kecmanović was elected new member of the Presidency, as the Serb delegate with most votes at the 1990 election, after Plavšić and Koljević, serving with Mirko Pejanović of the Social Democratic Party of Bosnia and Herzegovina. On 6 July 1992, Kecmanović resigned his post as Serb member of the Presidency, and was succeeded by Social Democratic Party member Tatjana Ljujić-Mijatović.

References

1947 births
Living people
People from Sarajevo
Serbs of Bosnia and Herzegovina
University of Sarajevo alumni
Bosnia and Herzegovina writers
Bosnia and Herzegovina political scientists
Bosnian sociologists
Serb writers from Bosnia and Herzegovina
Serbian political scientists
Serbian sociologists
Academic staff of the University of Sarajevo
Academic staff of the University of Belgrade
Academic staff of the University of Banja Luka
Union of Reform Forces of Yugoslavia politicians
Democratic Centre (Serbia) politicians
Members of the Presidency of Bosnia and Herzegovina